Oscar Bonsu Amoabeng (born 31 December 1984) is a retired footballer who played as a midfielder.

Born in Ghana, he was naturalized by Equatorial Guinea to play for its national team. He spent most of his club career in Belgium.

International career 
Amoabeng made his Equatorial Guinea national team debut on 6 September 2008 in a World Cup 2010 Qualifying match against Sierra Leone in Freetown. That day the Nzalang Nacional (the nickname of Equatorial Guinea national football team) lost by 2–0. Later, he played other World Cup 2010 Qualifying match (against South Africa on 11 October 2008, in Malabo).

References

External links

1984 births
Living people
Footballers from Accra
Naturalized citizens of Equatorial Guinea
Ghanaian footballers
Equatoguinean footballers
Association football midfielders
Association football wingers
Okwawu United players
Royal Cappellen F.C. players
Equatorial Guinea international footballers
Ghanaian expatriate footballers
Ghanaian expatriate sportspeople in Belgium
Expatriate footballers in Belgium